Chris Vermorcken is a Belgian film director and screenwriter. Her 1980 documentary film, My Name Is Anna Magnani, received the André Cavens Award for Best Film given by the Belgian Film Critics Association (UCC). Her other works include the TV series The New You Asked for It  and the documentary films The Hollywood Messenger (1985), Leonor Fini (1988), and Vers des rêves impossibles (1999).

References

External links

1936 births
Belgian screenwriters
Belgian women film directors
Belgian women screenwriters
Living people